Ampsalis is a genus of flies in the family Stratiomyidae.

Species
Ampsalis dichromata James, 1975
Ampsalis geniata Walker, 1859
Ampsalis iterabilis (Walker, 1859)
Ampsalis terminalis James, 1960

References

Stratiomyidae
Brachycera genera
Taxa named by Francis Walker (entomologist)
Diptera of Africa
Diptera of Asia